The men's team pursuit cycling event at the 1932 Olympic Games took place on August 2.  The format was a 4000 metres pursuit.

Results

The top four teams by time advanced to the semifinal.

Qualifying round

Qualifying

The winner of each of the two heats advanced to the final round.

Semifinal

Heat one

Heat two

Final
Match 1/2

Match 3/4

Key: OR = Olympic record

References

Track cycling at the 1932 Summer Olympics
Cycling at the Summer Olympics – Men's team pursuit